was a Japanese Nippon Professional Baseball player.

External links

1960 births
Living people
Japanese baseball coaches
Japanese baseball players
Managers of baseball teams in Japan
Nippon Professional Baseball first basemen
Nippon Professional Baseball second basemen
Nippon Professional Baseball third basemen
Hankyu Braves players
Nippon Professional Baseball infielders
Orix BlueWave players
Orix Braves players
Orix Buffaloes managers
Baseball people from Miyazaki Prefecture